is a Japanese actor, voice actor and narrator from Kagoshima Prefecture. He is represented by Aoni Production. His younger brother Yoku Shioya is also an actor and voice actor.

Biography

Filmography

Television animation
1980s
Mobile Suit Zeta Gundam (1985) (Roberto, Saegusa)
Akumatō no Purinsu: Mitsume ga Tōru (1985) (Drunk)
Blue Comet SPT Layzner (1985) (Manjuro)
Mobile Suit Gundam ZZ (1986) (Mondo Agake)
Dragon Ball (1986) (Suspicious Bird (episode 29), Panput's manager (episode 92))
Ginga: Nagareboshi Gin (1986) (Chūtora, Jaguar)
Transformers: Super-God Masterforce (1988) (Bullhorn)
Ranma ½ (1989) (Oni)
Dragon Ball Z (1989) (Majin Boo, Gurd, Universal Capsule Robot No. C6 (episode 9), Vodka (episode 174), Mō Kekkō (episode 290))
1990s
Dragon Ball Z: Bardock – The Father of Goku (1990) (Totapo)
The Brave Fighter of Sun Fighbird (1991) (Ace Baron, Thunder Baron/Thunder Jet)
Future GPX Cyber Formula (1991) (Checker Sugimoto)
The Brave Fighter of Legend Da-Garn (1992) (De Butcho)
Nintama Rantarō (1993) (Dai-San-Kyōeimaru Hyōgo, Dai-Yon-Kyōeimaru Hyōgo)
Slam Dunk (1993) (Kazushi Hasegawa, Nozomi Takamiya)
Slayers (1995) (Noonsa)
GeGeGe no Kitarō 4th series (1996) (Konaki-Jijii)
Dragon Ball GT (1996) (Majin Boo)
The King of Braves GaoGaiGar (1997) (Isamu Amami, Polonaise)
2000s
One Piece (2000) (Genzo, Pappag, Edward Weevil)
Kinnikuman II-Sei (2002) (Mayumi Kinniku)
Mobile Suit Gundam SEED (2003) (Al Jairi)
Futari wa Pretty Cure (2004) (Principal)
Naruto (2005) (Jigumo)
Yu-Gi-Oh! 5D's (Garome (episode 69))
2010s
Digimon Xros Wars (2011) (Olegmon)
Golden Time (2013) (Kōko's Father)
Dragon Ball Kai (2014) (Majin Boo)
World Trigger (2014) (Motokichi Kinuta)
Dragon Ball Super (2015) (Majin Boo, Peru)
GeGeGe no Kitarō 6th series (2018)(Tantanbō (ep. 3, 19), Kagami Jijii (ep. 8), Azuki Hakari (ep. 31)) (ep. 3, 8, 19, 31)
Tada Never Falls in Love (2018) (Villain″Reinbō Shōgun″) (ep. 3)
Gakuen Basara (2018) (Xavi)
2020s
The Millionaire Detective Balance: Unlimited (2020) (Yukihiro Kiyomizu)
Digimon Adventure: ShogunGekomon, Olegmon

Original video animation (OVA)Megazone 23 (1986) (Gutz)Yōma (1989) (Shiratsuyu)

Theatrical animationDoraemon: Nobita and the Castle of the Undersea Devil (1983) (Mu Patrolling Crew Member)They Were Eleven (1986) (Dolph Tasta)NEMO (1989) (Oompe)Movie Fresh Pretty Cure! The Kingdom of Toys has Lots of Secrets!? (2009) (Toy Majin)Bleach: Hell Verse (2010) (Taikon)Pretty Cure All Stars DX3: Deliver the Future! The Rainbow-Colored Flower That Connects the World (2011) (Toy Majin)Dragon Ball Z: Battle of Gods (2013) (Majin Boo)Ghost in the Shell: The New Movie (2015) (Akiyama)Shimajiro in Bookland (2016) (Voice) 

Video gamesDragon Ball series (1994–present) (Majin Boo)Sonic the Fighters (1996) (Bark the Polarbear)BS Nichibutsu Mahjong (????) (Manning Tanaka)BS Tantei Club: Yuki ni Kieta Kako (1997) (Shinnosuke Tachibana, Shintaro Tachibana, Jiro Kusano)Kingdom Hearts II (2005) (Chien-Po)Metal Gear Solid 2: Sons of Liberty (2001) (Fatman)Metal Gear Solid 3: Snake Eater (2004) (Nikita Khrushchev)Rockman X: Command Mission (2004) (Botos, Dr.Psyche)SatellaWalker (????) (Anda)SatellaWalker 2 (????) (Anda)Sengoku Basara (2005) (Imagawa Yoshimoto, Xavi)Sengoku Basara 2 (2006) (Imagawa Yoshimoto, Xavi)Sengoku Basara 2: Heroes (2007) (Imagawa Yoshimoto, Xavi)Tales of Hearts (2008) (Kornerupine)Sengoku Basara: Battle Heroes (2009) (Imagawa Yoshimoto, Xavi)Sengoku Basara: Chronicle Heroes (2011) (Imagawa Yoshimoto, Xavi)Return to PopoloCrois (2015) (Minister)

TokusatsuJuukou B-Fighter (1995) (Synthetic Beast Ebiganya) (ep. 26)Ultraman Tiga (1996) (Alien Standel Abolbas) (ep. 17)Gekisou Sentai Carranger (1996) (YY Gonza) (ep. 8)Mirai Sentai Timeranger (2000) (Blackmailer Geymark) (ep. 12, 45)Hyakujuu Sentai Gaoranger (2001) (Vacuum cleaner Org) (ep. 15)Bakuryuu Sentai Abaranger (2003) (Blastasaur Parasarokkiro) (eps. 19 - 50)Bakuryū Sentai Abaranger DELUXE: Abare Summer is Freezing Cold! (2003) (Burstosaur Parasarokkiro)Bakuryū Sentai Abaranger vs. Hurricaneger (2004) (Burstosaur Parasarokkiro)Tokusou Sentai Dekaranger (2005) (Kulernian Jellyfis) (ep. 48 - 49)Tensou Sentai Goseiger (2010) (Daicaci Alien Yokubabanger of the Electric Shock) (ep. 11)Zyuden Sentai Kyoryuger (2013) (Debo Jakireen) (ep. 13)Shuriken Sentai Ninninger (2015) (Youkai Daidarabotchi) (ep. 10)Kaitou Sentai Lupinranger VS Keisatsu Sentai Patranger (2018) (Ryugu Tamatebacco) (ep. 28)

Dubbing
Live-action
Oliver PlattIndecent Proposal (Jeremy)The Temp (Hartsell)The Three Musketeers (1998 TV Asahi edition) (Porthos)Bicentennial Man (2003 NTV edition) (Rupert Burns)Pieces of April (Jim Burns)Alice in Wonderland (Nivens McTwisp the White Rabbit (Michael Sheen))Alice Through the Looking Glass (Nivens McTwisp the White Rabbit (Michael Sheen))Annie: A Royal Adventure! (Mean Murphy Knuckles (Perry Benson))Armageddon (2002 Fuji TV edition) (Max Lennert (Ken Hudson Campbell))Batman Begins (2007 NTV edition) (Arnold Flass (Mark Boone Junior))Brothers & Sisters (Dennis York (Peter Gerety))Catch Me If You Can (Earl Amdursky (Brian Howe))CJ7 (The Boss (Lam Chi-chung))Constantine (Father Hennessy (Pruitt Taylor Vince))Daddy Day Care (Phil Ryerson (Jeff Garlin))Die Hard with a Vengeance (Charles Weiss (Kevin Chamberlin))Envy (Nick Vanderpark (Jack Black))ER (Jerry Markovic (Abraham Benrubi))Exit Wounds (2004 NTV edition) (T. K. Johnson (Anthony Anderson))The Full Monty (Dave Horsefall (Mark Addy))Get Smart (2011 TV Asahi edition) (Larabee (David Koechner))Ghosts of Mars (James "Desolation" Williams (Ice Cube))The Invention of Lying (Marl Bellison (Ricky Gervais))The Lost World: Jurassic Park (Dr. Robert Burke (Thomas F. Duffy))Paul Blart: Mall Cop (Paul Blart (Kevin James))Paul Blart: Mall Cop 2 (Paul Blart (Kevin James))Red Planet (Dr. Quinn Burchenal (Tom Sizemore))Rise of the Planet of the Apes (Robert Franklin (Tyler Labine))Saving Private Ryan (Sergeant Horvath (Tom Sizemore))She-Wolf of London (Charles)Shaolin Soccer (Light Weight Vest (Lam Chi-chung))Simon Sez (Micro (John Pinette))Skiptrace (Yung (Eric Tsang))Spin City (Paul Lassiter (Richard Kind))True Memoirs of an International Assassin (Netflix edition) (Sam Larson (Kevin James))

AnimationThe Pirates Who Don't Do Anything: A VeggieTales Movie (George (Pa Grape))Maya & Miguel (Madonaldo)Mulan (Chien Po)Mulan II (Chien Po)Penguins of Madagascar (King Julien XIII)Sonic SatAM (Rotor Walrus)Thomas the Tank Engine and Friends'' (Duck (Season 2-7), Murdoch (Season 7), Kelly, Lorry 3, Jem Cole (Season 2) and additional voices (Season 1-7))

References

External links
Official agency profile 
 Kōzō Shioya at GamePlaza-Haruka Voice Acting Database 
 Kōzō Shioya at Hitoshi Doi's Seiyuu Database
 
 

1955 births
Living people
Male voice actors from Kagoshima Prefecture
Japanese male child actors
Japanese male video game actors
Japanese male voice actors
Aoni Production voice actors
20th-century Japanese male actors
21st-century Japanese male actors